Okta (stylized in all caps) is the debut studio album by Norwegian supergroup Keiino, released on 8 May 2020. The album peaked at number 30 on the Norwegian Albums Chart. The album includes collaborations with a number of indigenous artists worldwide, including Electric Fields (Australia), Te Hau Tawhiti (New Zealand), Drezus (North America), and Charlotte Qamaniq (Canada).

In an interview with Wiwibloggs, group member Alexandra Rotan stated that "okta" means "one" in Sámi. Rotan said "All the songs have been written after Eurovision, so I think it had a huge impact on how the album turned out... We created the album on the road. We wrote the songs on the plane, backstage and in hotel rooms. And the songs with Te Hau Tawhiti and Electric Fields were written when we were on tour in Australia."

Reception
Scandipop said "If a better pop album is released in 2020, we'll be shocked, we'll be stunned, and we'll be – well – obviously delighted, too, in fairness."

Track listing

Charts

Release history

References

2020 debut albums